Nnamdi Azikiwe International Airport  is an international airport serving Abuja, in the Federal Capital Territory of Nigeria. It is the main airport serving the Nigerian capital city and was named after Nigeria's first President, Nnamdi Azikiwe (1904–1996).

History
A new airport terminal was built in 2000 by Julius Berger, located near to the existing terminal that served both domestic and international flights.  The new terminal opened in 2002 and serves international flights.  The existing terminal now serves domestic flights.

In November 2006 the Abuja Gateway Consortium signed a US$101.1 million contract for the management of the airport over the next 25 years. The contract included the construction of an airport hotel, private car parks, shopping malls, and a bonded warehouse, totalling US$50 million during its first five years, and additionally an upfront payment of US$10 million. According to the business plan, total investments would have amounted to US$371 million during the period of the contract. However, then-President Yar'Adua revoked the contract in April 2008.

In June 2009, Delta Air Lines established a link between Abuja and the United States. Boeing 757s began plying a route to New York City via Dakar. Boeing 767s performed the flight nonstop the following summer; afterward, Delta routed the service through Accra. The airline withdrew from Abuja in 2012, however, citing the high cost of fuel and diminished passenger counts. Meanwhile, an article in the newspaper Leadership noted that Delta also feared the city was becoming less safe. The terrorist group Boko Haram had committed several attacks in the country, including the capital. Moreover, officials had once restricted access to the Abuja airport due to suspicions of an impending attack.

Plans were invited for the construction of a second runway. The contract was awarded to Julius Berger Construction Company for US$423 million, but was revoked due to the high cost. The Federal Government approved fresh bids for the construction of the second runway.

On January 4, 2017, Nigeria's Federal Executive Council backed the Ministry of Aviation's decision to close the airport for six weeks to enable repairs on the runway, which was said to be dysfunctional. The Nigerian government also approved N1 billion for the conclusion of the Kaduna Airport terminal, which had been debated as an alternative for Abuja Airport. Several airport users, including the Nigerian Senate, opposed the planned closure. It was believed that the closure of the airport would cause hardship for international and local air travellers alike.

Starting March 8, 2017, Nigeria declared the airport closed for at least six weeks to bring needed repairs to the runway. On 18 April 2017, the airport was reopened following completion of this project.

On 20 December 2018, President Muhammadu Buhari commissioned a new terminal building. The Federal Airports Authority of Nigeria says the newly completed terminal building can process up to 15 million passengers annually.

Other facilities
The Nigerian Civil Aviation Authority (NCAA) has its Abuja office on the airport grounds; previously the airport had the authority's head office.

The airport operates a private jet wing that serves businesses, diplomats and politicians in the city. In 2016, the Ministry of Transportation announced plans for a new terminal for private Jet operations. The General Aviation Terminal project will cost N258 million naira and will include a new protocol Lounge and rehabilitation of the fire station at the Airport. It will serve non-scheduled flights.

2017 runway reconstruction 
In 2017, the Nigerian Government awarded a contract to Julius Berger for the emergency rehabilitation of the airport's only runway. It had been built to last for 20 years but had been in use for nearly 40 years at that time. The airport's runway was starting to show signs of fatigue and disrepair. The Airport was closed for 6 weeks, and flights were diverted to neighboring Kaduna airport. The Airport reopened with the completion of the Runway on the 17 of April 2017, 2 days ahead of schedule.

Airlines and destinations

Statistics
These data show number of passengers movements into the airport, according to the Federal Airports Authority of Nigeria's (FAAN) Aviation Sector Summary Reports.

Accidents and incidents
On February 21, 2021 a Nigerian Air Force Beechcraft B300 King Air 350i crashed shortly after takeoff while attempting to return to the airport. All seven on board died.

Gallery

See also
Transport in Nigeria
List of airports in Nigeria
List of the busiest airports in Africa

References

External links
 
 
 Abuja Airport at OurAirports
 

Airports in Nigeria
Buildings and structures in Abuja